The Biblioteca comunale Luciano Benincasa (the "Luciano Benincasa Municipal Library") is located in Ancona, Italy, in the Palazzo Mengoni-Ferretti, at the central Piazza del Plebiscito (Plebiscite Square).

History 

The library was established by bequest of Luciano Benincasa in 1669, whose will states that his private collection is to be made accessible to public use. In 1749, Eleonora Vincenzi gave the library to the municipality of Ancona, and it was moved from the palace of the Benincasa family to the Palace of the Elders. After 1800, the provincial archive was established in Ancona. In 1861, because of French rule over the city, the religious orders were suppressed, and their book collections were transferred to the municipal library; as a result the library collections significantly increased. In 1883 the library was moved to Carlo Rinaldini High School–Gymnasium. In 1911 the historical archive was merged with that of the municipality, and in 1925 moved again to the former convent of San Francesco delle Scale. During World War II, the convent of San Francesco was destroyed as a result of British bombing (1943/1944), and the historical collections – with their nineteenth-century inventories – suffered serious damage. After the war the city bought the Casa Mengoni-Ferretti, and in 1950 the library was reopened in the new premises. The historical archive, first merged in 1971, was moved from the State archives.

Collection 

In 2007 the library collection has approximately 145,000 prints. Among the older works are 343 manuscripts, 62 incunabula (from the 15th century) and 2600 printed books from the 16th century. The collection also includes a Fondo Musicale with 241 musical manuscripts of more than 50 composers (among them  Luigi Boccherini, Arcangelo Corelli, Joseph Haydn). The majority of musical works date from the second half of the 18th century and include 62 manuscripts with compositions of Giuseppe Tartini, 16 manuscripts with compositions of Emanuele Nappi, plus 40 compositions dated to 1644.

The library holds also various audio books for the blind.

See also 
 Biblioteca Comunale (Siena)

References

Further reading 
 Alessandro Aiardi,  La biblioteca Luciano Benincasa di Ancona, in  Collectio Thesauri. Dalle Marche tesori nascosti di un collezionismo illustre, I,1, a cura di Mauro Mei, Firenze, Edifir, 2004, pp. 263–264.
 Aristide Boni, L'origine della biblioteca  comunale, prefazione al Catalogo dell'archivio Storico, Ancona, 1956.
 Palermo Giangiacomi, La Biblioteca comunale e l'Archivio  storico di Ancona, Ancona, 1932.
 C. Feroso, Cenni storici della Biblioteca comunale di Ancona, Ancona  1883

External links 
 Biblioteca sul sito comunale
 LA BIBLIOTECA COMUNALE BENINCASA CHIEDE AIUTO!
 Regolamento della Biblioteca Comunal "L. Benincasa" di Ancona
 Biblioteca Communale Luciano Benincasa (AN)

Libraries in Ancona
Ancona
Culture in le Marche
Libraries established in 1669